Deltina Hay (born 1960) is an American author, publisher, professor, web developer and. She is the author of many inbound marketing books as well as a lecturer on social media, Web 2.0, the mobile web, search engine optimization and other inbound marketing tactics. She is a contributor to numerous online publications including Technorati, SocialMedia.biz, and Six Revisions. She serves as a board member for the Independent Book Publishers Association where she also contributes to their newsletter and is an invited board member of the Internet Marketing Standards Board. She is considered a pioneer of Web 2.0 and is most notable for her book A Survival Guide to Social Media and Web 2.0 Optimization, which has been adopted by numerous journalism and public relations departments.

Early life and education

Hay was born on December 19, 1960, in Fairbanks, Alaska, and raised in the remote fishing town of Haines, Alaska. She attended the University of Alaska in Juneau, where she was awarded a Bachelor of Science in Management information systems in 1987. She earned her Master of Science in Applied mathematics and Computer science from Oregon State University in 1994. Hay completed her Master of Arts in 2006 when she received her degree in Counselling psychology from St. Edward's University in Austin, Texas.

Professional career

Hay is a professor at Drury University where she teaches courses on Web 2.0 and social media courses. 

She is also the founder and principal of Dalton Publishing, an independent publishing company that specializes in poetry and contemporary literature. Dalton Publishing has published nearly 20 books, including Shadows & Light, Journeys With Outlaws in Revolutionary Hollywood by veteran stuntman Gary Kent and the 2010 book of poetry The Skin of Light by Texas poet laureate Larry Thomas. 

Hay started two blog sites; Social Media Power and Mobile Web Slinger. Hay is also the founder of Plumb Web Solutions.

Publications and lectures
Hay is the author of four books. She is a lecturer and has spoken at events such as IBPA's Publishing University, the Publisher's Association of the South's Winder Conclave, the Writers' League of Texas' Editors and Agents Conference, the American Advertising Federation, the St. Louis Publisher's Association, and the Pacific Northwest Bookseller's Association. She is a featured speaker for Social Marketing Animals, a website dedicated to providing social marketing tips and advice.

Lectures

Hay has given many lectures throughout the United States. In 2008, she presented at the Publisher's Association of the South's Winter Conclave where she gave a presentation on using social media newsrooms. She also gave a presentation on social media for authors at the 2008 Writer's League of Texas Editors and Agents Conference in Austin, Texas.

Hay was a featured presenter at the 2009 Governor's Nonprofit Leadership Conference in Dallas, Texas. She was also the keynote speaker at the 2009 Voluntary Organizations Active in Disaster Conference held in Austin, Texas.

Hay was a major contributor to the IBPA's Publishing University 2009 BookExpo America held in New York City.

Bibliography

References

External links 
 

American technology writers
Living people
American marketing people
1960 births
Writers from Fairbanks, Alaska